Dustin Grow Cheever (January 30, 1830 – February 6, 1897) was a member of the Wisconsin State Assembly.

Biography
Cheever was born on January 30, 1830, in Hardwick, Vermont. In June 1851, he moved to Clinton (town), Rock County, Wisconsin, where he worked, among other things, as a farmer. He was a Baptist.

In 1853, Cheever married Christiana Grow. They had two children before her death on January 1, 1873. Cheever later married Dell Louisa Bailey, a widowed mother of one, on October 17, 1878. He died in February 1897.

Political career
Cheever was a member of the Assembly in 1872 and 1873. Other positions he held include Town Clerk and Chairman of the Town Board (similar to city council) of Clinton, county supervisor of Rock County, Wisconsin, and justice of the peace. He was a Republican.

References

People from Caledonia County, Vermont
People from Clinton, Rock County, Wisconsin
Republican Party members of the Wisconsin State Assembly
Wisconsin city council members
City and town clerks
County supervisors in Wisconsin
Baptists from Wisconsin
19th-century Baptists
Farmers from Wisconsin
1830 births
1897 deaths
19th-century American politicians
Baptists from Vermont
American justices of the peace